Nadao Bangkok Co., Ltd. is a Thai media company. Founded in 2009, it did business in artist management and television and music production, but ended those operations in 2022. The company is headed by Songyos Sugmakanan, its largest shareholder and CEO, and was previously a partially owned subsidiary of the film studio GDH 559 (itself a subsidiary of entertainment conglomerate GMM Grammy).

The company was established under GDH's predecessor GTH, and initially focused only on talent management for GTH's actors. It branched into television production with the 2013 hit TV series Hormones, and since then produced television and streaming drama series including Project S, In Family We Trust, My Ambulance and I Told Sunset About You. A music production arm, Nadao Music, was launched in 2019 as a creative venue for artists under the company's umbrella, who numbered 39 in 2020, mostly young actors catering to Nadao and GDH's target audience group of 15–30-year-olds. However, the company ended its artist management as well as series and music production operations in 2022, citing its artists' growth and diverging priorities among its staff.

History
Nadao Bangkok Co., Ltd. was registered on September 9, 2009. The company was founded as a partially owned subsidiary of film studio GMM Tai Hub (GTH) to manage its growing roster of actors and help develop their talents. It was headed by Songyos Sugmakanan, who had directed several films with GTH.

During its first few years, the company focused on casting and artist management, but struggled to generate revenue. In 2012, Songyos conceived the teen drama television series Hormones to create acting opportunities for the company's teenage actors. The series, released in 2013, became widely popular, prompting the company to produce two subsequent seasons. Hormones success became a turning point for Nadao, giving it a renewed focus on content production for television as well as the streaming service Line TV, for whose 2015 launch Nadao produced the miniseries Stay.

As GTH was dissolved at the end of 2015 due to internal disagreements, its holdings in Nadao Bangkok were transferred to its successor GDH 559. Nadao further expanded as it partnered with concert organizer 4nologue to launch the boy group Nine by Nine in 2018, releasing its first mainstream prime-time series In Family We Trust as part of the project. By 2020, when it released I Told Sunset About You, its staff had grown to fifty, up from eight during the creation of Hormones. It had 39 actors signed under its label at the beginning of that year. Most were young actors, catering to Nadao and GDH's target audience group of 15–30-year-olds.

The company launched an in-house record label, Nadao Music, as a business unit in 2019. Aimed at opening up opportunities in music to its artists, its first release, "Rak Tid Siren" ("My Ambulance"), the soundtrack to its 2019 series My Ambulance, became one of the most popular songs of the year. Singer Supol Phuasirirak was brought on as the unit's director and main producer. The company also launched a talent development unit, titled Nadao Academy, to recruit new members, in 2020.

In 2022, the company ended its artist management as well as series and music production operations, effective June 1, citing its artists' growth and diverging priorities among its staff. GDH CEO Jina Osothsilp explained in an interview that the decision was made over the preceding two years, as Songyos felt he had run out of passion to continue with the current operation, and many opportunities were now available to its artists, the world having changed so that it was now much easier to self-manage as individuals compared to before.

Operations
Nadao Bangkok has an authorized capital of 2 million baht (US$60,000 in 2009), and is headquartered at 92/14 Soi Sukhumvit 31, Khlong Tan Nuea Subdistrict, Watthana District, Bangkok. Songyos is the company's largest shareholder and serves as its CEO.

Before it ceased activity in 2022, Nadao Bangkok was 32% owned by Songyos, 30% by GDH, 10% by Hub Ho Hin Bangkok (GDH's minority owner), and 28% by others. Its board of directors included Boosaba Daorueng (CEO of GDH's majority owner GMM Grammy), GDH CEO Jina, Songyos, Rojjarek Luerojwong, and Jongjit Inthung (Nadao's senior artist manager). With the cessation of operations, GDH offloaded its stake in the company to Songyos at a price of 6,948,780 baht.

Nadao did business in three main areas: artist management, production, and music. From 2016 to 2019, it reported increasing revenues from 166 million baht ($5M) to 392 million ($12M) and profits from 17 million baht ($500,000) to 40 million ($1.2M), which dropped to 313 million ($10M) and 29 million ($900,000) in 2020, when the COVID-19 pandemic hit. Its artist management business generated 60–70 percent of its revenue, and the rest was from production. (The music unit had not become profitable as of October 2020.) However, its production business yielded higher profit margins of 20–30 percent, while artist management yielded 8–15 percent.

With Songyos and his team's background in film, Nadao regularly employed filmmaking techniques in its creative process rather than those typical of traditional television productions. This resulted in higher costs (production of Nadao series cost about 2.5 million baht per episode, compared to 1.4–1.5 million for most mainstream prime-time series) which limited the company's capacity, though Songyos insisted on maintaining quality as a distinctive feature of their output.

Former actors
Senior

 Sunny Suwanmethanont (Sunny)
 Chantavit Dhanasevi (Ter)
 Suvikrom Amaranon (Per)
 Pattarasaya Kreursuwansiri (Peak)
 Ratchu Surajaras (Vaan)

First Gen

 Pachara Chirathivat (Peach)
 Ungsumalynn Sirapatsakmetha (Pattie)
 Chutavuth Pattarakampol (March)
 Sutatta Udomsilp (PunPun)
 Supassara Thanachat (Kao)
 Sirachuch Chienthaworn (Michael)
 Sananthachat Thanapatpisal (Fon)
 Awat Ratanapintha (Ud)
 Gunn Junhavat (Gunn)
 Napat Chokejindachai (Top)
 Thanapob Leeratanakajorn (Tor)
 Kemisara Paladesh (Belle)
 Oabnithi Wiwattanawarang (Oab)
 Sedthawut Anusit (Tou)
 Tonhon Tantivejakul (Ton)

Next Gen

 Chanon Santinatornkul (Non)
 Teeradon Supapunpinyo (James)
 Nutchapan Paramacharenroj (Pepo)
 Teetatch Ratanasritai (Kaopun)
 Saruda Kiatwarawut (Babymild)
 Pavadee Komchokpaisan (Cook)
 Atitaya Craig (Claudine)
 Nichaphat Chatchaipholrat (Pearwah)
 Chayanit Chansangavej (Pat)
 Krissanapoom Pibulsonggram (JJ)
 Kanyawee Songmuang (Thanaerng)
 Thiti Mahayotaruk (Bank)
 Wongravee Nateetorn (Sky)
 Narikun Ketprapakorn (Frung)
 Sarit Trilertvichien (Pea)
 Kanish Vichienvanitchakul (Omp)
 Narupornkamol Chaisang (Praew)
 Dan Pruekpayoong (JJ)
 Jirayus Khaobaimai (Rolex)

New Gen

 Jesadawat Suwanvanichakij (Jade)
 Chonlathorn Kongyingyong (Captain)
 Paris Intarakomalyasut (Ice)
 Ponlawit Ketprapakorn (Pond)
 Putthipong Assaratanakul (Billkin)
 Krit Amnuaydechkorn (PP)
 Panachai Sriariyarungruang (Junior)
 Kandis Wanaroon (Mai-Ake)
 Ingkarat Damrongsakkul (Ryu)
 Sawanya Paisarnpayak (Nana)
 Pongpol Panyamit (Khunpol)

Works

Television series

Film

Short films

Nadao Music

Television programs

References

External links
 
 
 
 

Nadao Bangkok
Mass media companies of Thailand
GDH 559
GMM Grammy